KSAI may refer to:

 KSAI (FM), a radio station (90.3 FM) licensed to serve Salem, Oregon, United States
 KSAI (AM), a defunct radio station (936 AM) formerly licensed to serve Susupe, Saipan, Northern Mariana Islands